Cémoi is a French chocolate manufacturer founded by Jules Pares in 1814 in Arles-sur-Tech, Pyrénées-Orientales. Cémoi is the biggest French chocolate manufacturer and the 26th in the world.

The Cémoi group owns 15 factories and 4 warehouses around the world.

History

The origins 
In 1814, Jules Pares founded one of the first French chocolate factory in Arles-sur-Tech, which eventually became Cémoi.

Development and diversification 
In 1962 the businessman Georges Poirrier bought the company and changed its name to Cantalou. During the Trente glorieuses and with the development of the consumer society, the group changed its business model to produce mainly chocolate bars for supermarkets. It started to buy its competitors: Frankonia in 1977, Phoscao in 1979, Aiguebelle and Cémoi, whose name it took, in 1981.

Factory and warehouses 
The Cémoi group owns 15 factories around the world:
 9 factories in France
 1 factory in Germany
 1 factory in Wales
 1 factory in Poland
 1 factory in Ivory Coast
It also owns 4 warehouses:
 3 warehouses in France
 1 warehouse in Spain

Cémoi Cocoa 
Cémoi Cocoa comes from the following countries:

 Ivory Coast
 Ecuador
 São Tomé and Príncipe
 Vanuatu

References

External links 
 Official Website

French chocolate companies
Companies based in Languedoc-Roussillon
Food manufacturers of France
French brands
Pyrénées-Orientales